David Smalley may refer to:

Dave Smalley, American punk musician
Dave Smalley (pop musician) (born 1949), American musician and former member of 70s power pop group The Raspberries
Dave Smalley (basketball) (1934–2007), American basketball coach
David Allen Smalley (1809–1877), U.S. judge in Vermont